Westerland may refer to:

Westerland, Germany, a town on the island Sylt, Schleswig-Holstein, Germany
Westerland, Netherlands, a village in North Holland, Netherlands
"Westerland" (song), by Die Ärzte

pt:Westerland